The 2nd G7 Summit, also called Rambouillet II, was held at Dorado, Puerto Rico, between June 27 and 28, 1976.  The venue for the summit meetings was the Dorado Beach Hotel, now Dorado Beach Resort, which is near San Juan, Puerto Rico.

The Group of Six (G6) was an unofficial forum which brought together the heads of the richest industrialized countries: France, West Germany, Italy, Japan, the United Kingdom, and the United States; and the Group of Seven (G7), meeting for the first time this year, was formed with the addition of Canada. This summit, and the others which would follow, were not meant to be linked formally with wider international institutions; and in fact, a kind of frustrated rebellion against the stiff formality of other international meetings was an element in the genesis of cooperation between France's president and West Germany's chancellor as they conceived the first summit of the G6.

Leaders at the summit
The G7 is an unofficial annual forum for the leaders of Canada, France, West Germany, Italy, Japan, the United Kingdom and the United States.

The 2nd G7 summit was the first summit for British Prime Minister James Callaghan and, as it was formed with the addition of Canada, Canadian Prime Minister Pierre Trudeau. It was also the last summit for Italian Prime Minister Aldo Moro, Japanese Prime Minister Takeo Miki, and US President Gerald Ford.

The first summit session began at 4:15 p.m. and concluded at 7:05 p.m., while the second and final took place between 9:00 a.m. and 11:30 a.m., however, the leaders' held speeches until 3:00 p.m. Both sessions were celebrated at the Dorado Beach Hotel's Salon Del Mar.

Participants
These summit participants are the current "core members" of the international forum: Trudeau of Canada had been invited because he had eight years experience.

Issues
The summit was intended as a venue for resolving differences among its members. As a practical matter, the summit was also conceived as an opportunity for its members to give each other mutual encouragement in the face of difficult economic decisions.

Gallery

See also
 G8

Notes
 Bayne, Nicholas and Robert D. Putnam. (2000).  Hanging in There: The G7 and G8 Summit in Maturity and Renewal. Aldershot, Hampshire, England: Ashgate Publishing. ; OCLC 43186692
 Reinalda, Bob and Bertjan Verbeek. (1998).  Autonomous Policy Making by International Organizations. London: Routledge.  ; ;   OCLC 39013643

References

External links
 No official website is created for any G7 summit prior to 1995 -- see the 21st G7 summit.
 University of Toronto: G8 Research Group, G8 Information Centre
 G7 1976, delegations & documents

 Presidential Itinerary (June 26–28, 1976)
 Presidential Daily Diary (June 26, 1976)
 Presidential Daily Diary (June 27, 1976)
 Presidential Daily Diary (June 28, 1976)
 Joint Declaration 
 Memorandum of Conversation (First Session, June 27, 1976)
 Memorandum of Conversation (Second Session, June 28, 1976)
Documents archived at the Gerald R. Ford Presidential Library
President's Introductory Statement at the Puerto Rico Summit
Economic Summit - Puerto Rico documents
National Security Adviser's Memoranda of Conversation
International Economic Summit - Puerto Rico, 1976
Puerto Rico Economic Summit memorandum
Remarks Upon Arrival for International Summit Conference, Puerto Rico

G7 summit
G7 summit
1976 in international relations
1976 in Puerto Rico
G7 summit 1976
G7 summit 1976
1976
June 1976 events in North America